Molly Yeh (born May 22, 1989) is an American cookbook author and blogger who is the host of the Food Network cooking show Girl Meets Farm.

Early life 
Yeh was born and raised in Glenview, Illinois, to Jody (née Shinbrod) and clarinetist John Bruce Yeh. Her mother is Jewish and her father is Chinese. She has an older sister, Jenna, who is a chef, as well as a younger half sister, Mia.

Yeh attended Glenbrook South High School
and the Midwest Young Artists Conservatory, where she was a member of two percussion ensembles—The Rattan Trio  and Beat 3--  which won consecutive gold medals (2004 and 2005) in the junior division of the Fischoff National Chamber Music Competition. She kept journals from a young age which turned into her blog in 2009.

After high school, she moved to New York City to attend the Juilliard School, where she was editorial assistant and writer at The Juilliard Journal and in 2011 earned a Bachelor of Music degree in percussion.

Career 
In October 2016, Yeh published her first book, Molly on the Range: Recipes and Stories from An Unlikely Life on a Farm (Rodale Books), for which she won the Judges' Choice IACP Cookbook Award in 2017. In June 2018, it was announced that Yeh would be hosting a cooking show on Food Network. The series, Girl Meets Farm, debuted on June 24, 2018. Her eleventh season of Girl Meets Farm launched on September 4, 2022. Also in November 2018, she was a co-host on From the Top, a podcast showcasing young classical musicians. Yeh had previously appeared on the show twice as a teenager, in 2004 and 2007. In 2021 she hosted the show Ben and Jerry's Clash of the Cones. She took over as host of Spring Baking Championship for its eighth season, premiering February 28, 2022. Molly Yeh has also made a restaurant in East Grand Forks, MN, called Bernie's.

Personal life 
In 2014, Yeh married fellow Juilliard music major Nick Hagen and moved to East Grand Forks, Minnesota where Hagen is a fifth-generation farmer.

In November 2018, Yeh announced that she and her husband were expecting their first child. On March 30, 2019, Yeh gave birth to a daughter, Bernadette Rosemary Yeh Hagen, named after her husband's great-great-grandfather Bernt (who started the Hagen farm) and her own great-great-grandfather, Bernard. In September 2021, Yeh announced she and her husband were expecting their second child in February 2022. Their second daughter, Ira Dorothy Yeh Hagen, was born on February 20, 2022. Ira's name was suggested by Jamie, the director of photography for Girl Meets Farm.

Bibliography

References

External links 
 
 

1989 births
American people of Chinese descent
American businesspeople
American cookbook writers
American television chefs
American women bloggers
American bloggers
Food Network chefs
Juilliard School alumni
Living people
People from Glenview, Illinois
American women chefs
American women non-fiction writers
21st-century American non-fiction writers
Jewish American chefs
Jewish American writers
Chefs from Illinois
American women percussionists
Musicians from Chicago
21st-century American women writers
International Association of Culinary Professionals award winners
21st-century American Jews